Cornwall and Stormont was a federal electoral district represented in the House of Commons of Canada from 1882 to 1904. It was located in the province of Ontario. This riding was created in 1882 from parts of Cornwall and Stormont ridings.
 
It consisted of the town of Cornwall and the townships of Cornwall, Osnabruck, Finch and Roxborough.

The electoral district was abolished in 1903 when it was merged into Stormont riding.

Election results

|}

|}

|}

|}

On Mr. Bergin's death, 22 October 1896:

|}

|}

See also 

 List of Canadian federal electoral districts
 Past Canadian electoral districts

External links 
Riding history from the Library of Parliament

Former federal electoral districts of Ontario